Smak Super 45 is the first maxi single by the Serbian rock band Smak, released in 1978. The release features the songs "Nevidljive terazije" and "Hitopadeza".

Track listing

External links

Smak albums
1975 EPs
Serbian-language albums
PGP-RTB EPs